Basketball ID at the 2000 Summer Paralympics consisted of a men's event with eight teams competing. The sport was a form of basketball adapted for players with intellectual disabilities (ID).

Cheating controversy

The Basketball ID event at the 2000 Paralympic Games were marred by one of sport's biggest controversies which saw a classification of athlete removed from the next two Paralympic games. Fernando Martin Vicente, former head of the Spanish Federation for Mentally Handicapped Sports, allowed athletes with no disabilities to compete at the Games in order to win the gold medal. The team at the centre of the row was the Spanish basketball team, who won the gold medal after beating Russia in the final despite fielding a team mainly composed of athletes with no intellectual disability. The athletes were quickly exposed and the IPC reacted by stripping Spain of their medal and removing all events from the following Games for athletes with intellectual disabilities. Events for athletes with intellectual disabilities returned to the Paralympic schedule in 2012.

Medal summary 

Spain originally won the gold medal, but they were disqualified after it was discovered that ten of the team's twelve players were not disabled. 

As a consequence of this decision, official results indicate that no gold medal was awarded for this event: Thomas Reinecke, the Chief Operating Officer of the International Paralympic Committee at the time, stated in an interview with the BBC in 2021 that the silver medalists, Russia, were not awarded the gold medal because they failed to provide evidence regarding the classification of its own team.

Group stage

Finals

References 

2000 Summer Paralympics events
Paralympics
2000
Para
Paralympic Games controversies